In mathematics, the Riemann–Roch theorem for surfaces describes the dimension of linear systems on an algebraic surface. The sheaf-theoretic version is due to Hirzebruch.

Statement
One form of the Riemann–Roch theorem states that if D is a divisor on a non-singular projective surface then

where χ is the holomorphic Euler characteristic, the dot . is the intersection number, and K is the canonical divisor. The constant χ(0) is the holomorphic Euler characteristic of the trivial bundle, and is equal to 1 + pa, where pa is the arithmetic genus of the surface. For comparison, the Riemann–Roch theorem for a curve states that χ(D) = χ(0) + deg(D).

Noether's formula

Noether's formula states that

where χ=χ(0) is the holomorphic Euler characteristic, c12 = (K.K) is a Chern number and the self-intersection number of the canonical class K, and e = c2 is the topological Euler characteristic. It can be used to replace the 
term χ(0) in the Riemann–Roch theorem with topological terms; this gives the Hirzebruch–Riemann–Roch theorem for surfaces.

Relation to the Hirzebruch–Riemann–Roch theorem
For surfaces, the Hirzebruch–Riemann–Roch theorem is essentially the Riemann–Roch theorem for surfaces combined with the Noether formula. To see this, recall that for each divisor D on a surface there is an invertible sheaf L = O(D) such that the linear system of D is more or less the space of sections of L. 

 

Fortunately this can be written in a clearer form as follows. First putting D = 0 shows that

      (Noether's formula)

For invertible sheaves (line bundles) the second Chern class vanishes. The products of second cohomology classes can be identified with intersection numbers in the Picard group, and we get a more classical version of Riemann Roch for surfaces:

 

If we want, we can use Serre duality to express h2(O(D)) as h0(O(K − D)), but unlike the case of curves there is in general no easy way to write the h1(O(D)) term in a form not involving sheaf cohomology (although in practice it often vanishes).

Early versions
The earliest forms of the Riemann–Roch theorem for surfaces were often stated as an inequality rather than an equality, because there was no direct geometric description of first cohomology groups. 

where
r is the dimension of the complete linear system |D| of a divisor D (so r = h0(O(D)) −1)
n is the virtual degree of D, given by the self-intersection number (D.D)
π is the virtual genus of D, equal to 1 + (D.D + K.D)/2
pa is the arithmetic genus χ(OF) − 1 of the surface
i is the index of speciality of D, equal to dim H0(O(K − D)) (which by Serre duality is the same as dim H2(O(D))).

The difference between the two sides of this inequality was called the superabundance s  of the divisor D. 
Comparing this inequality with the sheaf-theoretic version of the Riemann–Roch theorem shows that the superabundance of D is given by s = dim H1(O(D)). The divisor D was called regular if i = s = 0 (or in other words if all higher cohomology groups of O(D) vanish)  and superabundant if s > 0.

References
 Topological Methods in Algebraic Geometry by Friedrich Hirzebruch 

Theorems in algebraic geometry
Algebraic surfaces
Topological methods of algebraic geometry